Maibaum is a German surname meaning "maypole". Notable people with the surname include:

Richard Maibaum (1909–1991), American film producer, playwright, and screenwriter
Tom Maibaum, British-Canadian computer scientist

See also
Heinrich Meibom (disambiguation)

German-language surnames